This list includes all boxers from Wales who have won a recognised British, Commonwealth, European or World title; or a boxer who has won one of the Welsh Area boxing titles.

Welsh champions

flyweight

bantamweight

super-bantamweight

featherweight

super-featherweight

lightweight

Light welterweight

welterweight

light middleweight

middleweight

super-middleweight

light heavyweight

cruiserweight

heavyweight

British boxing champions

Commonwealth (British Empire) boxing champions

European boxing champions

World boxing champions

*NWS: Newspaper Decision

References

boxing